HMS Pelorus (pennant number: J291) was an  built for the Royal Navy (RN) during World War II. Upon completion, the ship became the flotilla leader of the 7th Minesweeper Flotilla, clearing mines off the east coast of England. In June 1944, the flotilla was assigned to sweep one of the beaches during the Normandy landings until she struck a mine the following month. After her repairs were completed, Pelorus was reassigned to the English Channel and the 6th Minesweeping Flotilla. The flotilla was transferred to the Indian Ocean in 1945 and spent some time escorting convoys. They participated in Operation Collie, a bombardment of Japanese positions in the Nicobar Islands, in July and then swept the Strait of Malacca and the approaches to Singapore in August.
 
After the war, she was sold to the South African Navy and renamed HMSAS Pietermaritzburg. The ship was later converted into a midshipmans' training ship during the early 1960s. She served as a barracks ship from 1968 to 1991 when Pietermaritzburg was listed for disposal. The ship was scuttled as an artificial reef off the South African coast in 1994.

Description 
She was powered by a pair of vertical triple-expansion steam engines, each driving one propeller shaft, using steam provided by two Admiralty three-drum boilers. The ship was armed with a single 4-inch (102 mm) Mk V dual-purpose gun and four single mounts for Oerlikon  light anti-aircraft (AA) guns. For anti-submarine work, Pelorus was fitted with two depth charge rails, and four depth charge throwers. The ship was equipped with a Type 271 surface-search radar and a Type 291 air-search radar. Her crew numbered 85 officers and ratings.

During the war the two single Oerlikon mounts on the bridge wings were replaced by twin power-driven mounts and the two remaining single mounts aft were superseded by two single  Bofors AA guns before the ship sailed for the Far East. In preparation for her reclassification as a training ship, Pietermaritzburg had her sweeping gear removed and was rearmed with her main armament replaced by a twin-gun turret fitted with more powerful 4-inch Mk XVI guns in 1961–62. The Bofors guns were moved to the roof of the enlarged aft superstructure. Her complement now consisted of 8 officers, 73 ratings, 10 midshipmen and 50 trainees. She was refitted in 1971.

Construction and career
Pelorus was named after Pelorus Jack, a Risso's dolphin that often escorted ships through French Pass in New Zealand. The ship was ordered on 1 January 1942 from Lobnitz of Renfrew, Scotland and laid down on 8 October. She was launched on 18 June 1943 and completed two months later on 7 October. The ship was assigned to the newly formed 7th Minesweeping Flotilla upon completion and served as the flotilla leader. The flotilla was tasked with clearing mines off the east coast of England until June 1944 when they were assigned to sweep the minefields protecting Juno Beach during the Normandy landings. Pelorus led the flotilla on 6 June and was thus the leading ship of the entire invasion fleet. While sweeping the approaches to Cherbourg, she struck a mine that damaged the port engine and propeller. The ship was under repair for three months and was transferred to the 6th Minesweeping Flotilla at Plymouth when they were completed.

The flotilla sailed for the Far East on 8 April 1945 and was assigned convoy escort duties on arrival. On 2 July, they swept the approaches to the Nicobar Islands during Operation Collie and destroyed 167 mines. As the Pacific War was ending on 15 August, they swept the Strait of Malacca and the approaches to Singapore. Together with the light cruiser , Pelorus was one of the first British ships to re-enter Singapore harbour. She returned home in May 1946 and was paid off.

In 1947 the ship was sold to the South African Navy, together with her sister ship, Rosamund, and departed England on 22 November after a refresher course at the minesweeping school at HMS Lochinvar, Port Edgar, Scotland. The sisters arrived at Cape Town on 24 December, making stops at Gibraltar, Freetown and Walvis Bay en route. She was rechristened by the mayor of the city, A. E. Hirst, on 21 January 1948. The navy had originally intended to rename the ship Maritzburg, but decided to use the city's full name after protests. In November of that year, the sisters exercised with the British 3rd Aircraft Carrier Squadron. Later that month, together with the frigate , they visited ports in Portuguese Mozambique, returning to Durban on 12 December. While serving as a midshipmans' training ship, Pietermaritzburg became the largest South African warship to visit Knysna in September 1953. The ship and her sister were placed in reserve for a time in the late 1950s.

Pietermaritzburg re-commissioned as a dedicated training ship on 30 August 1962. While participating the training exercise Capex 63 with the Royal Navy, the ship accidentally rammed the British frigate . Although her bow was crushed by the collision, both ships were able to steam back to Simon's Town, South Africa for repairs. The subsequent inquiry found officers from both ships negligent. She was placed back in reserve in July 1964 and became an accommodation ship at Simon's Town for the navy's minesweeping flotilla on 17 June 1968. Pietermaritzburg was listed for disposal in 1991 and the navy made the decision to dispose of her as an artificial reef.

Pietermaritzburg was scuttled on 12 November 1994 to make an artificial reef at Miller's Point near Simon's Town. It has begun to collapse and the interior is much less accessible than it used to be. The wreck and surrounding  was declared a South African National Heritage Site on 23 August 2013 after legal salvage efforts in 2012 had badly damaged the wreck.

Citations

References

External links
 HMS Pelorus at uboat.net
 SAHRIS Site Recording of SAS Pietermaritzburg SHIPWRECKID1512
 

 

Algerine-class minesweepers of the Royal Navy
Ships built on the River Clyde
1943 ships
World War II minesweepers of the United Kingdom
Algerine-class minesweepers of the South African Navy
Shipwrecks of the South African Atlantic coast
Ships sunk as artificial reefs
Ships sunk as dive sites
Maritime incidents in 1994
South African heritage sites